Nimbahera stone is a kind of limestone which is found near Nimbahera city in the Chittorgarh district of Rajasthan, India. It is blue in colour and inferior to Kota Stone. It is used as major raw material in cement plants; in fact, there are a lot of cement plants in Chittorgarh district and specially in Nimbahera because of the stone's availability in the region.

Major Cement Plants in the District and nearby:
1. J.K. Cement Works, Nimbahera. 
2. J.K. Cement Works, Mangrol.
3. Wonder cement, Nimbahera.
4. Lafarge Cement, Nimbahera.
5. Birla Cement, Chanderiya.
6. Aditya Cement, Shambhupura.
7. Vikram Cement, Khor.
8. Cement Corporation of India CCI, Nayagaon(now defunct)

Geology of Rajasthan
Limestone
Mining in Rajasthan